Carawan is a surname. Notable people with the surname include:

Candie Carawan (born 1939), American civil rights activist, singer, and author
Claudia Carawan (born 1959), American singer-songwriter and pianist
Evan Carawan, American hammered dulcimer player
Guy Carawan (1927–2015), American folk musician and musicologist